Mellow Beats, Friends & Lovers is a compilation album of various artists including Nujabes, Uyama Hiroto, Naoki Maeda, Dwele, Golden Boy, Sora, Takagi Masakatsu, Kuniyuki Takahashi, and Rei Harakami.

Track listing

 Nujabes featuring Giovanca and Benny Sings - "Kiss of Life" 4:53
 No.9 - "After It" 6:41
 Chari Chari - "Aurora" 9:28
 CALM - "Sitting on the Beach" 5:08
 Ino Hidefumi - "Green Power" 5:18
 Akira Kosemura - "Departure" 3:13
 DJ Mitsu the Beats featuring Dwele - "Right Here" 4:48
 J.A.M featuring José James - "Jazzy Joint" 4:06
 Sora - "Revans" 5:06
 Takagi Masakatsu - "Gelnia" 2:56
 Kuniyuki Takahashi featuring Henrik Schwarz and Yoshihiro Tsukahara - "The Session (Kuniyuki's Piano Mix)" 7:04
 Rei Harakami - "Lust" 4:57
 World Supreme Funky Fellows 2102 - "#1 Dub" 4:40
 Uyama Hiroto featuring Golden Boy - "Vision Eyes" 4:02
 Grooveman Spot featuring O.C. - "Maintain" 3:59
 Nujabes - "Child's Attraction (Short Edit for MB Outro)" 3:24

Hip hop compilation albums
2009 compilation albums